Journal of Career Development is a peer-reviewed academic journal that publishes papers in the field of Psychology. The journal's editor is Lisa Y. Flores (University of Missouri). It has been in publication since 1972 and is currently published by SAGE Publications in association with Curators of the University of Missouri.

Abstracting and indexing 
Journal of Career Development is abstracted and indexed in, among other databases:  SCOPUS, and the Social Sciences Citation Index. According to the Journal Citation Reports, its 2017 impact factor is 1.473, ranking it 47 out of 82 journals in the category ‘Psychology, Applied’.

References

External links 
 
 UM Official website

Career development
English-language journals
SAGE Publishing academic journals
University of Missouri